Mawlānā Abul-Ma'ānī Mīrzā Abdul-Qādir Bēdil (or Bīdel), also known as Bedil Dehlavī (1642–1720), was an Indian Sufi, and considered one of the greatest Indo-Persian poets, next to Amir Khusrau, who lived most of his life during the reign of Aurangzeb, the sixth Mughal emperor. He was the foremost representative of the later phase of the "Indian style" (sabk-e hendī) of Persian poetry, and the most difficult and challenging poet of that school.

Life
Bedil was born in Azimabad (present-day Patna) in India. He was the son of the Mirza Abd al-Khaliq (d. 1648), a former Turkic soldier who belonged to the Arlas tribe of the Chaghatay. The descendants of the family had originally lived in the city of Bukhara in Transoxiana, before moving to India. Bedil's native language was Bengali, but he also spoke Urdu (then known as rikhta), Sanskrit and Turkic, as well as Persian and Arabic, which he learned in elementary school.

Bīdel mostly wrote Ghazal and Rubayee (quatrain) in Persian, the language of the Royal Court, which he had learned during his childhood. He was the author of 16 books of poetry, which contained nearly 147,000 verses and included several masnavi in that language. He is considered one of the prominent poets of Indian School of Poetry in Persian literature, and is regraded as having his own unique style. Both Mirza Ghalib and Iqbal-i Lahori were influenced by him. His books include Tilism-i Hairat (طلسم حيرت), Tur i Ma'rifat (طور معرفت), Chahār Unsur (چهار عنصر) and Ruqa'āt (رقعات).

Possibly as a result of being brought up in such a mixed religious environment, Bīdel had considerably more tolerant views than his poetic contemporaries. He preferred free thought to accepting the established beliefs of his time, siding with the common people and rejecting the clergy who he often saw as corrupt.

Bīdel's work is highly regarded in Afghanistan, Tajikistan and Pakistan. Bīdel came back to prominence in Iran in 1980s. Literary critics Mohammad-Reza Shafiei-Kadkani and Shams Langrudi were instrumental in Bīdel's re-emergence in Iran. Iran also sponsored two international conferences on Bīdel.

The Indian school of Persian poetry, especially Bīdel's poetry, is criticised for its complex and implicit meanings.  As a result, However, it better regarded in Afghanistan, Tajikistan, Pakistan and India than in Iran.  In Afghanistan, a unique school in poetry studying is dedicated to Bīdel's poetry called Bīdelšināsī (Bīdel studies), and those who have studied his poetry are called Bīdelšinās (Bīdel experts). His poetry plays a major role in Indo-Persian classical music in central Asia. Many Afghan classical musicians (e.g. Mohammad Hussain Sarahang and Nashenas) have sung Bīdel's ghazals.

Grave 
His grave, called Bāġ-e Bīdel (Garden of Bīdel) is situated across Purana Qila, at Mathura Road next to the Major Dhyan Chand National Stadium gates and the pedestrian bridge over Mathura Road in Delhi.

Works
 Bıdil, ‘Abd al-Qadir. Avaz-hayi Bidil: Nasri adabi (Ruq‘at - Nukat – Isharat – Chahar - ‘Unsur). Edited by Akbar Bihdarvand. Tihran: Nigah, 1386 [2007].
 Bıdil, ‘Abd al-Qadir. Kullıyat. Lakhnahu: Naval Kishor, 1287 [1870 or 1871].
 Bıdil, ‘Abd al-Qadir. Ghazaliyati Bidil Dihlavi. Edited by Akbar Bihdavand. Shiraz: Navid-i Shiraz, 1387 [2008 or 2009].

References

Notes 

 Erkinov A. "Manuscripts of the works by classical Persian authors (Hāfiz, Jāmī, Bīdil): Quantitative Analysis of 17th-19th c. Central Asian Copies". Iran: Questions et connaissances. Actes du IVe Congrès Européen des études iraniennes organisé par la Societas Iranologica Europaea, Paris, 6-10 Septembre 1999. vol. II: Périodes médiévale et moderne. [Cahiers de Studia Iranica. 26], M.Szuppe (ed.). Association pour l'avancement des études iraniennes-Peeters Press. Paris-Leiden, 2002, pp. 213–228.
 Gould R. "Bīdel," Encyclopedia of Indian Religions. Ed. Arvind Sharma.. New York: Springer, 2013.
 R. M. Chopra, "Great Poets of Classical Persian", Sparrow Publication, Kolkata, 2014,

Citations

Bibliography
 Ahmad, Mohamad Bohari Haji. "The Ideas of Wahdat Al-Wujud in the Poetry of'Abd Al-Qadir Bidil (Persian), Ibrahim Hakki Erzurumlu (Ottoman Turkish), and Hamzah Fansuri (Malay)." PhD diss., 1990.
 Faruqi, Shamsur Rahman. "A stranger in the city: The poetics of Sabk-i Hindi." Annual of Urdu Studies 19, no. 1 (2004): 93.
 Fekrat, Nasim. "Esoteric Keys of Mirza Abd al-Qadir Bidel." MA Thesis., University of Georgia, 2018.
 Ghani, Abdul. Life and Works of Abdul Qadir Bedil. Lahore: Publishers United, 1960.
 Iqbal, Allama Muhammad. Bedil in the light of Bergson. Edited by Tehsin Firaqi. Lahore: Universal Boks/Iqbal Academy Pakistan, 1988. 
 Keshavmurthy, Prashant. Persian Authorship and Canonicity in Late Mughal Delhi: Building an Ark. Routledge, 2016.
 Kovacs, Hajnalka. "‘The Tavern of the Manifestation of Realities’: The ‘Masnavi Muhit-i azam’by Mirza Abd al-Qadir Bedil (1644–1720)." PhD diss., University of Chicago (2013).}
 Siddiqi, Mohammed Moazzam. An Examination of the Indo-Persian Mystical Poet Mīrzā ʻAbdul Qādir Bēdil with Particular Reference to His Chief Work ʻIrfān. University of California, 1975.}
 Zipoli, Riccardo. "A computer-assisted analysis of Bidel's' Tur-e Ma ‘refat'." Annali di Ca'Foscari: Rivista della Facoltà di Lingue e Letterature straniere dell'Università di Ca'Foscari, 2005, vol. 44 (3), pp. 123–138 (2005). 
 Zipoli, Riccardo. Riflessi di Persia-Reflections of Persia. Venezia: Libreria Editrice Cafoscarina, 2013.

External links

 internationaler Kongreß auf Bidel Dehlavi (Tehran 2006) (BBC Persian)]
 [ابوالمعالی بیدل A brief Article in Urdu
  collected poetry of Bīdel in scanned authentic version uploaded by Javed Hussen
 Poems of Bīdel (Persian)
 Some of Bedil's eclectic lines and quatrains.

1642 births
1720 deaths
Persian-language poets
Indian Sufis
17th-century Indian Muslims
Poets from Delhi
Mughal Empire people
17th-century Indian poets
Writers from Patna
18th-century Indian poets
Indian people of Turkic descent
16th-century Turkic people